The Delmar Divide refers to Delmar Boulevard as a socioeconomic and racial dividing line in St. Louis, Missouri. The term was popularized outside Greater St. Louis by a four-minute documentary from the BBC. Delmar Blvd. is an east–west street with its western terminus in the municipality of Olivette, Missouri extending into the City of St. Louis. There is a dense concentration of eclectic commerce on Delmar Blvd. near the municipal borders of University City and St. Louis. This area is known as the Delmar Loop. Delmar Blvd. is referred to as a “divide” in reference to the dramatic difference in racial populations in the neighborhoods to its immediate north and south: as of 2012, residents south of Delmar are 73% white, while residents north of Delmar are 98% black, and because of corresponding distinct socioeconomic, cultural, and public policy differences.

History of segregation in St. Louis

In 1916, during the Jim Crow Era, St. Louis passed a residential segregation ordinance. This ordinance stated that if 75% of the residents of a neighborhood were of a certain race, no one from a different race was allowed to move into the neighborhood. This ordinance did not stand as it was challenged in court by the NAACP.

In response, racial covenants on housing were introduced. These prevented the sale of houses in certain neighborhoods to "persons not of Caucasian race". The racial covenants were ruled to be unconstitutional in 1948 when they were overturned in the Shelley v. Kraemer Supreme Court case.

In those 32 years, the covenants caused The Ville (an area of St. Louis several blocks north of Delmar) to become the main black middle-class neighborhood.

In 1954, St. Louis passed an ordinance to redevelop the Mill Creek Valley, an African American area district that is several blocks south of Delmar Blvd. In 1959, when the redevelopment began, the Mill Creek Valley was torn down to build an addition to Saint Louis University, Highway 40, LaClede Town, and Grand Towers. Most of the people that were displaced by this redevelopment moved to The Ville and an area north of Delmar to Natural Bridge.

To further combat the displacement of the Mill Creek Valley, the St. Louis Housing Authority increased the amount of public housing north of Delmar which continued into the 2000s. This solidified Delmar Blvd as a racial and socioeconomic dividing line.

Statistics and studies

As estimated by the U.S. Census Bureau, in 2014 the populations separated by Delmar Blvd. were as follows.

The Delmar Divide illustrates segregation issues in St. Louis more broadly. Segregation in St. Louis, Missouri has been the subject of many studies. A Manhattan Institute study entitled “The End of the Segregated Century: Racial Separation in America's Neighborhoods, 1890-2010” studied segregation in U.S. cities with the largest population of black residents. The study ranked each city by a dissimilarity index and an isolation index. The dissimilarity index measures the extent to which different racial groups are found to live in equal proportion in each neighborhood in a city. The higher the number, the higher a percentage of a racial group would need to move to a different neighborhood to achieve equality. The isolation index measures neighborhoods that have extremely different racial makeups. In 2010, St. Louis ranked 14th in African American population, with a dissimilarity index of 71.0 (the fifth-highest score in major cities in the US) and an isolation index of 53.8 (the 6th highest score in major cities in the US). This study found St. Louis to be one of the most segregated cities in the U.S.

A study done by Washington University in St. Louis and Saint Louis University found the higher number of African American residents in a community is correlated with higher rates of poverty. This study, titled "Segregation in St. Louis: Dismantling the Divide", also notes that Saint Louis "ranks 42nd out of 50 large metro areas" when assessing a child's probability to climb up the social and income hierarchy (that is, economic ascension from lowest 1/5th of population to highest 1/5th by the time of adulthood). Moreover, it points out that the "average annual inflation rate" for home equity was "-0.4%" for households with Black residents, compared to positive increases for other households.

In addition, this racial segregation data is viewable in one study collecting the 2010 census data into an interactive map showing one dot for each person recorded, color-coded by race.

Gentrification along the Delmar Divide
Starting in the early 1900s, St. Louis was one of few cities that actively pushed for legalizing local zoning. In Mapping Decline, author Colin Gordon notes that the fear of a "negro invasion", orchestrated by local realtors, led to the formation of a “new organization...that called for racial zoning, provoked practices of school segregation, and overall advocated for 'mutual restriction' between the two primary races". This lay the foundation that has impacted St. Louis ever since.

In the 1970s, rapid urban renewal expanded upon the underlying foundation of gentrification.  According to Gordon, the short-term focus of this renewal was "attracting high-income residents back downtown and eradicating the 'worst slums'" of the city, the majority of which were in the northern parts of the city. These efforts of urbanization ultimately failed, however, and left the regions “blighted” and considered by earlier advocates of development to be :an economic liability".

Gordon goes on to mention that many of such developmental failures lie primarily in the northern section of St. Louis, one cause of the divide along the northern and southern regions of Delmar.

By the late 1990s, the leading minority loan-lender banks in the city, Boatmen's, was in danger of dismantling. In 1993, as part of the Community Reinvestment Act (CRA), Boatmen's Bank announce it would provide $284million per year to all borrowers in all communities. In the following years, Boatmen's received consecutive awards for its service to minorities in St. Louis. But, after acquiring Boatmen's in 1996, NationsBank dismantled the many minority-lending programs, which largely remain unavailable, particularly in the region north of Delmar.

As Ian Trivers finds, "despite the prime location and low cost housing...the neighborhoods directly north of the prosperous CWE [the Central West End, south of the Delmar Divide] have experienced almost no redevelopment and repopulation spillover". Trivers goes on to say that neighborhoods north of Delmar are still recovering from the brunt past; physical violence increased and "vacant buildings" and "empty lots are common sights" on the north side of Delmar.

Income-Level Disparity Along the Divide
A 2014 joint report issued by Washington University in St. Louis and Saint Louis University, titled “Segregation in St. Louis,” investigates the wealth gap between black and white families along the Delmar Divide. The report notes the “average African-American family takes 228 years to amass the same amount of wealth as the average white family”. Additionally, the same study reports that the wealth return generated by education between Black and White families differ by as much as $50,000. In “Black Lives and Policing: The Larger Context of Ghettoization,” author John Logan depicts that while poverty in the suburbs of St. Louis is “below 12%,” Ferguson “tracts in the range of 20-25% poor” with some even above “35% poor”. In “What Do We Mean When We Say, ‘Structural Racism,’” author Walter Johnson writes that “federal housing assistance” in the city are often placed under a “segregated housing market,” ultimately causing many blacks to be illegally excluded.  As J. Rosie Tighe states in “The Divergent City: Unequal and Uneven Development in St. Louis,” the region's clear divide along the Delmar into the north and south means that “lower income households and people of color … are disproportionately concentrated … and suffer disproportionality from the resulting misdistribution”.

Difference in Education Levels
According to the article “Segregation in St. Louis,” resources available for education are very scarce along the northern part of Delmar Boulevard. Specifically, lack of resources to schools in this area not only hinders the academic success of students but also leads to an overall “disconnection from the economic mainstream”. Moreover, funding comes primarily from the residents within the specified school district, and since the majority of the families living north of Delmar “have limited resources, … adequate developmental support” for schools in this region of the city becomes more and more challenging, therefore widening the gap.

References

Anti-black racism in the United States
Geography of St. Louis
History of St. Louis